Zardab or Zard Ab may refer to:
Zardab (city), Azerbaijan
Zardab District, in Azerbaijan
Zardab, Kermanshah, in Iran
Zard Ab, Mazandaran, in Iran
Zardab, South Khorasan, in Iran
Zard Ab, Tehran, in Iran